Şehzade Mehmed Cemaleddin Efendi (1 March 1891 – 18 November 1947) was an Ottoman prince, the son of Şehzade Mehmed Şevket and the grandson of Sultan Abdulaziz.

Early life
Şehzade Mehmed Cemaleddin was born on 1 March 1891 in the Yıldız Palace. His father was Şehzade Mehmed Şevket, son of Sultan Abdulaziz and Neşerek Kadın, and his mother was Fatma Ruyinaz Hanım. He was only child of his parents. His father died when he was eight. In 1899, he was circumcised together with Şehzade Abdurrahim Hayri, son  of Sultan Abdul Hamid II and Şehzade Mehmed Abdülhalim, son of Şehzade Selim Süleyman.

Military career
Cemaleddin worked on the Libyan Front. He carried out guerrilla activities against the British in Egypt. He saw an active service during the First World War. He participated in the war with the rank of major general and fought on various fronts. He first served on the Gallipoli Front. He fought in the landing at Seddülbahir in 1915. There he fell ill and was withdrawn from the service.

He was then appointed as Commander of the training camps of the 3rd Army, where he stayed for two years. After the conquest of Batumi in April 1918, which was given to the Ottoman Empire under the Treaty of Brest-Litovsk in March 1918, leading to the entry of Turkish troops the following month. Celameddin was sent there, where he served under Wehib Pasha. In his memoirs, Wehib Pasha mentioned the prince's conduct and abilities extremely positively.

During the Armistice period, he traveled around Rumelia and the Black Sea coast as the head of the Advisory Committee. He played a role in suppressing the Revolt of Ahmet Anzavur. Kâzım Karabekir mentions Cemaleddin in his diaries. Cemaleddin was an idealist soldier, and did not like the state of the officers. By 1918, he was serving as honorary aide-de-camp to the Sultan.

Cemaleddin, who had won the hearts of the soldiers and the people with his kindness and honest treatment, wanted to go to Anatolia, but the presence of a popular and powerful prince at the beginning of the resistance movement was not accepted by the Ankara government. However, at the end of 1919, the Ankara government thought of declaring him as the regent of the Ottoman Empire and Sheikh Sünûsî as Shaykh al-Islām. However, in the light of information received from Kâzım Karabekir, it was decided that he could not be made the regent.

Personal life
His only wife was married Cemile Destaviz Hanım. She was born on 13 August 1895 in Batumi, Adjara. They married on 2 March 1913 in the Ortaköy Palace. She was the mother of Şehzade Mahmud Hüsameddin, born on 1 September 1916 and Şehzade Süleyman Saadeddin, born on 20 November 1917.

Exile and death
At the exile of the Imperial family in March 1924, Cemaleddin and his family settled in Beirut, Lebanon, where he died on 18 November 1947.

Honours

 Order of Glory, Jeweled
 Order of Distinction, Jeweled
 Order of Osmanieh, Jeweled
 Order of the Medjidie, Jeweled
 Liakat War Medal
 Navy Medal in Gold
 Liakat War Medal in Gold
 Greek War Medal

Military appointments

Military ranks and army appointments
 1915: Major General of the Infantry, Ottoman Army

Honorary appointments
 1918: Aide-de-Camp to the Sultan

Issue

Ancestry

References

19th-century Ottoman royalty
20th-century Ottoman royalty
1891 births
1946 deaths
Royalty from Istanbul